Nikola Mektić (born 24 December 1988) is a Croatian professional tennis player who is a former world No. 1 in doubles.

He is a two-time Grand Slam champion, having won the 2021 Wimbledon Championships in men's doubles partnering compatriot Mate Pavić, and the 2020 Australian Open with Barbora Krejčíková in mixed doubles. Mektić also finished runner-up at the 2020 US Open with Wesley Koolhof in men's doubles, and the 2018 US Open with Alicja Rosolska in mixed doubles.

He became world No. 1 in men's doubles in October 2021, the second Croatian to reach this ranking. Mektić has won 16 doubles titles on the ATP Tour, including six at Masters 1000 level with four different partners. He also won the 2020 ATP Finals with Koolhof. In singles, he reached his highest ranking of world No. 213 in May 2013. Mektić was part of the Croatian team which won the 2018 Davis Cup, and won men's doubles gold at the 2020 Olympic Games alongside Pavić.

Early and personal life
Mektić was born in Zagreb, Croatia in 1988 to Mirko (father) and Višnja (mother). He began playing tennis at age 6 after his brother Luka took up the sport.

Career
After spending a better part of a decade on the ATP challenger tour and achieving a career high ranking of No. 213 in singles (on May 6, 2013), in 2016 Mektić decided to focus on doubles. 
The same year he reached his first ATP men's doubles final as a wildcard at the 2016 Croatia Open Umag with his compatriot Antonio Šančić. Since then, he has won sixteen ATP men's doubles titles, including one doubles Grand Slam title, six Masters 1000 titles, one mixed doubles Grand Slam and the 2020 ATP Finals.

2018-2019: First Grand Slam final, three Masters titles
In 2018 Mektic and Alexander Peya qualified for the 2018 ATP Finals in London. The same year Mektić reached his first Grand Slam finals (in mixed doubles) at the 2018 US Open, partnering Alicja Rosolska, and won the Davis Cup playing for Croatia. He also won three Masters 1000 with three different partners in Madrid (2018), Indian Wells (2019) and Monte Carlo (2019).

2020: ATP Finals doubles title, Australian Open mixed title, top 10 doubles ranking
2020 was the most successful year for Mektić in his career thus far. He won the 2020 ATP Finals in doubles partnering Wesley Koolhof and the 2020 Australian Open mixed doubles event partnering Barbora Krejčíková. He also reached the doubles final at the 2020 US Open partnering again with Wesley Koolhof. As a result he finished the year at No. 8 in the top 10 rankings in doubles and No. 3 in the doubles race with his partner Wesley Koolhof.

2021: New partnership, eight ATP titles including a historic Wimbledon title, First Croatian Olympic tennis champion, World No. 1
Starting 2021, Mektić partnered successfully with his compatriot Mate Pavić. They won four ATP titles including the doubles title at the 2021 Miami Open in the beginning of April and reached the 2021 Australian Open doubles semifinals and 2021 Dubai Tennis Championships final in the first three months of the year. Following these results, Mektić returned to his No. 4 high-career ranking on April 5.

On April 18, Mektić clinched his fifth ATP Masters 1000 in a row and second Masters title of the year at the 2021 Monte-Carlo Masters where the pair defeated, for the second time in the final of a Masters in 2021, the British pair of Neal Skupski and Dan Evans.

Seeded No. 2 the pair also reached the final at the 2021 Mutua Madrid Open Masters where they lost to the No. 3 seeded pair Horacio Zeballos and Marcel Granollers and the final of the Italian Open where they won the title defeating No. 5 seeded pair Rajeev Ram and Joe Salisbury. After the win, Mektić moved to his career-high ranking of World No. 2 on 17 May 2021.

In their first Grand Slam doubles final, top seeds Mektić and Pavić had the biggest victory of their 2021 season as a team defeating Granollers and Zeballos to triumph in doubles at the 2021 Wimbledon Championships.
They became the first Croatian players to win the Wimbledon men's doubles title. They are also the first players from their country to win at the All England Club since Goran Ivanisevic's 2001 victory in singles and Ivan Dodig's 2019 mixed doubles win with Latisha Chan.

At the Olympics he won the gold medal with Pavić in an all-Croatian final defeating Ivan Dodig and Marin Cilic. It was the country's first gold medal in the sport and the third time in the Olympics men's doubles' history that the same country won both gold and silver, and the first one since 1908.

On 18 October 2021, following a quarterfinal showing with Pavic at the 2021 BNP Paribas Open, Mektić became World No. 1 in doubles. He is only the second Croatian tennis player in history to be ranked No.1 in the world in doubles.

2022: Second Italian Masters, 20th title
The Croatian pair won their second Italian Open Masters crown and defended their 2021 title.
At the 2022 Geneva Open the pair won their second title for the season.

At the ATP 500 2022 Queen's Club Championships Mektic won his third title for the season with Pavic and twentieth overall in his career. The pair also successfully defended their title at the 2022 Eastbourne International.

At the 2022 Wimbledon Championships the Croatian pair reached the semifinals in straight sets with a win over 11th seeds Kevin Krawietz and Andreas Mies and the final defeating six seeded Columbian pair of Robert Farah (tennis) and Juan-Sebastian Cabal in a five sets with a fifth set super tiebreak over 4 hours match.

The pair won another ATP 500 title at the 2022 Astana Open making it fifth for the season.

Doubles performance timeline 

Current through the 2022 Wimbledon Championships.

Significant finals

Grand Slam tournament finals

Doubles: 3 (1 title, 2 runner-ups)

Mixed doubles: 2 (1 title, 1 runner-up)

Olympic finals

Doubles: 1 (1 Gold medal)

Year-end championships

Doubles: 2 (1 title, 1 runner-up)

Masters 1000 finals

Doubles: 9 (7 titles, 2 runner-ups)

ATP career finals

Doubles: 38 (23 titles, 15 runner-ups)

ATP Challenger and ITF Future titles

Singles (15)

Doubles (15)

References

External links
 
 
 

1988 births
Living people
Croatian male tennis players
Tennis players from Zagreb
Australian Open (tennis) champions
Wimbledon champions
Tennis players at the 2020 Summer Olympics
Olympic tennis players of Croatia
Medalists at the 2020 Summer Olympics
Olympic gold medalists for Croatia
Olympic medalists in tennis
ATP number 1 ranked doubles tennis players
ITF World Champions
21st-century Croatian people